Kyla Brox (born 3 June 1980, Stockport, Greater Manchester, England) is a blues and soul singer from a  musical family.

Family and childhood
Her father is blues singer Victor Brox and her mother is Annette Brox, the 'maid by the fire' in the original Jesus Christ Superstar. 

Kyla traces her interest in singing to a desire to be closer to her charismatic but distant dad. Upon Victor and Annette’s divorce, Kyla was brought up by Annette and her stepfather Laurie in Didsbury, Manchester.    

Keen to encourage his daughter’s musical talents, Victor gave Kyla various instruments as a child, including the flute which still features in her live shows. 

Kyla married long-time music partner Danny Blomeley in September 2008 and is the mother of Sadie (born 13 June 2009). Kyla also has a second child Sunny.

Career
Kyla first sang with Victor onstage at the Band on the Wall in Manchester in 1992,  at the age of 12. She joined his regular touring group the following year. The core of the Kyla Brox Band go back to this unit, nominally the Victor Brox Blues Train, but known informally as 'the child slavery band' because of the extreme youth of the players. As well as Kyla (13), the group contained bassist Danny Blomeley (13), and drummer Phil Considine (19). 

In 2000, she accompanied her father on an extensive tour of Australia. Danny Blomeley had left the Blues Train two years earlier to travel the world, and promised to find Victor some dates in Australia. Kyla, now 20, found herself singing risque blues songs to hard men in mining camps in remote parts of the Australian outback.  

Back in Manchester in 2001, Kyla and Danny formed a duo, occasionally augmented by old members of ‘the child slavery band’, and the line-up finally settled into the Kyla Brox Band - Kyla Brox (vocals, flute); Marshall Gill (guitar); Tony Marshall (saxophones); Danny Blomeley (bass) and Phil Considine (drums). The Kyla Brox Band started playing in North West pubs and clubs: the circuit that had once been the stomping ground of the Victor Brox Blues Train. Their performance at the Colne Blues Festival in 2002 established Kyla's reputation on the British blues scene. 

The Kyla Brox Band toured Australia in 2003, 2004 and 2007, the same year they made their US debut.

Discography

Solo
 2007 - Gone (Pigskin Records)
 2009 - Grey Sky Blue (Pigskin Records)
 2009 - Coming Home (as The Kyla Brox Band, Pigskin Records)
 2014 - Live... At Last (Pigskin Records)
 2016 - Throw Away Your Blues (Pigskin Records)
 2019 - Pain & Glory (Pigskin Records)

With Victor Brox
 1998 - Kyla Jane & Victor With The Brox Gang
 2000 - Darwin Night Train, as Victor Brox Blues Train
 2001 - Belly Shiver (Bridgetown Blues), credited as Victor and Kyla Brox
 2009 - Frog in Mah Pocket!, credited to Victor ‘Pur & Dur’ & Kyla ‘Raving Jane’ Brox

Quotes
"Her breathing control is superb but, more than this… Kyla's vocal is natural and very clean… with a depth of feeling…" - Blues Matters  
"An authentic soul diva… sensitive, sexy, and with infinite reserves of sassiness" - City Life

References

External links
 Kyla Brox bio
 Kyla Brox webpage
 Kyla Brox review by jazz journalist Mike Butler
 

Living people
1980 births
People from Stockport